The Oncoming Storm is the second studio album by American metalcore band Unearth. It was released on June 29, 2004 through Metal Blade Records. The album was produced by Killswitch Engage guitarist Adam Dutkiewicz, and was their first major release through Metal Blade Records. This was also their first album with drummer Mike Justian and bassist John "Slo" Maggard, replacing Mike Rudberg and Chris "Rover" Rybicki respectively.

After its release, the album entered the Billboard album charts at number 105, selling 13,285 copies.

A special edition of the album was released on October 18, 2005. It contained two bonus tracks, and a DVD featuring live performances, backstage footage, interviews, an inside look to the recording of the album and four music videos.

Reception

Public reception 
The Oncoming Storm was well received by the public.

Track listing

Personnel 
Production and performance credits are adapted from the album liner notes of the 2004 version.

Unearth
 Trevor Phipps – lead vocals
 Buz McGrath – guitar
 Ken Susi – guitar, backing vocals on "Endless", "Lie to Purify"
 John "Slo" Maggard – bass, backing vocals, piano, guitars on "Aries"
 Mike Justian – drums

Production
 Adam Dutkiewicz – production, engineering, mixing
 Alan Douches – mastering, CD enhancement
 Cory Kilduff – layout
 Matt Hayes – layout
 Aaron Marsh – layout
 Grail – photos

Charts

References

External links 
 
  The Oncoming Storm at Metal Blade

2004 albums
Unearth albums
Metal Blade Records albums
Albums produced by Adam Dutkiewicz